The Ironton–Russell Bridge is two bridges that carry and have carried traffic along the Ohio River between Ironton, Ohio and Russell, Kentucky in the United States. The original light-blue cantilever Ironton-Russell  Bridge, opened in 1922 and closed in 2016, carried two lanes of traffic and a narrow sidewalk. The new white cable-stayed bridge, which has two lanes of traffic without a dedicated sidewalk and officially named the Oakley C. Collins Memorial Bridge, opened on November 23, 2016.

History
In 2000, the Ohio Department of Transportation (ODOT) released a report recommending the replacement of the then 78-year-old original span. The bridge was retrofitted in the 1970s with strengthening beams and plates.  Later inspection of the bridge revealed that these plates had been welded to the bridge using techniques that violated the bridge welding codes and reduced the fatigue strength of primary load members.  As a result of these findings, ODOT added reinforcements to some vertical members to improve structural redundancy.

The original span was still forced to close when temperatures approach -5 degrees Fahrenheit due to the brittle nature of the steel used. Continuous monitoring was routine during temperatures below freezing to check for any cracking in the substructure of the span. In addition, in May 2008, ODOT placed a width restriction on the bridge, banning all vehicles wider than 7 ft. 6 in. Emergency vehicles, non-commercial vehicles and non-profit buses (such as school buses) were exempt from the restriction. ODOT authorized both Ohio and Kentucky law enforcement agencies to enforce the restriction.

One of the replacements considered was a three-lane single-tower cable suspension bridge. The final design was chosen in January 2003, however, the high costs of constructing the bridge became apparent when costs for the new bridge came in at $110 million, well over the original estimated cost. The sharp rise was attributed to the dramatic increase in construction costs partially blamed on Hurricane Katrina, which increased the cost of concrete materials and items derived from petroleum products. The bridge was redesigned as a two tower cable-stayed bridge, was reduced from three lanes to two and does not have a dedicated pedestrian walkway. Construction on the replacement span began in March 2012. Unlike the original bridge, which connects downtown Ironton with downtown Russell, the new bridge connects downtown Ironton directly with U.S. 23 and KY 244 within the city limits of Russell just south of downtown. The new bridge opened on November 23, 2016 with a ceremony and parade through Ironton and Russell that included crossing both the new and original structures. As part of the ceremony, the new bridge was officially named for the late Oakley C. Collins, who represented Lawrence County in both the Ohio House of Representatives and the Ohio Senate. The original bridge remained open during construction and was permanently closed at the completion of the dedication ceremony and parade. Demolition of the original structure began in December 2016 and was completed in June 2017.

See also
List of crossings of the Ohio River

References

Further reading
 Ironton-Russell Bridge at Bridges & Tunnels
 Ironton-Russell Bridge at Historic Bridges of Michigan and Elsewhere

Road bridges in Ohio
Bridges over the Ohio River
Bridges in Greenup County, Kentucky
Buildings and structures in Lawrence County, Ohio
Cable-stayed bridges in the United States
Transportation in Lawrence County, Ohio
Bridges completed in 1922
Bridges completed in 2016
Road bridges in Kentucky
Former toll bridges in Kentucky
Former toll bridges in Ohio
Cantilever bridges in the United States
Concrete bridges in the United States